{{Infobox beauty pageant|photo=|venue=Pattaya, Thailand|winner=Isabella Santiago|date=7 November 2014|presenters=Puwanart KunpalinSaraichatt Jirapaet|acts=Marcela OhioMiss International Queen 2013Alumni MIQ Winners|entrants=21|placements=10|caption=|best national costume=Nitsa Katrahong|broadcaster=Channel 3 (Thailand)|congeniality=Yuni Carey|photogenic=Nitsa Katrahong|before=2013|next=2015|returns=|withdraws=|debuts=}}Miss International Queen 2014, the tenth Miss International Queen pageant, was held on November 7, 2014, at Pattaya City in Thailand. Marcela Ohio of Brazil crowned her successor, Isabella Santiago of Venezuela at the end of the event.'''

Results

Special Awards

Best in Talent

Contestants

References

External links 
 

2014 beauty pageants
2014
Beauty pageants in Thailand